Avia Traffic Company Flight 768 was a scheduled passenger flight from Bishkek to Osh, Kyrgyzstan. On 22 November 2015, the Boeing 737-300 operating the flight was on final approach to Osh it touched down hard enough to shear off the left and right main landing gear. The aircraft skidded off the runway with the left engine being torn from its mount. There were no fatalities in the accident, but 14 people were injured.

Accident

Aircraft
The aircraft involved was a Boeing 737-3YO, registration EX-37005, originally delivered to Philippine Airlines in 1990; it was later sold to Garuda Indonesia, Citilink and Sama Airlines before being sold to Avia Traffic Company in 2011. The aircraft was 25 years old at the time of the accident. The aircraft was written off after the accident.

Landing
The aircraft had originally departed Krasnoyarsk Airport Russia for Osh but diverted to Bishkek due to fog in Osh. After the weather improved, the crew departed for Osh.

The aircraft was performing an ILS approach to Osh's runway 12 at about 07:56L (01:56Z) but touched down hard causing the landing gear to collapse and separate from the aircraft. Four occupants received serious injuries and ten occupants received minor injuries.

Investigation
Russia's Civil Aviation Authority opened an investigation into the accident. Preliminary reports suggested the aircraft was performing an ILS approach to Osh's runway 12, with  visibility in fog. The crew conducted a go-around following a hard touch down and joined the traffic pattern, but during the traffic pattern the crew decided to divert to their alternate and return to Bishkek, but soon after they received warnings of two hydraulic system failures, as well as failure of the No.2 engine, which was caused by the collapsed right landing gear. The crew shut the No.2 engine down and decided to perform an emergency landing at Osh, despite weather being below safe minima. The aircraft touched down very hard and skidded off the runway.

See also
Garuda Indonesia Flight 200
Turkish Airlines Flight 1878

References

Accidents and incidents involving the Boeing 737 Classic
Airliner accidents and incidents caused by pilot error
Aviation accidents and incidents in 2015
Aviation accidents and incidents in Kyrgyzstan 
2015 disasters in Kyrgyzstan
November 2015 events in Asia
Osh